David P. Forsberg is a former American government official, who previously served as the New England Regional Administrator-Regional Housing Commissioner for the United States Department of Housing and Urban Development in 1989, then served as Secretary of Health and Human Services of Massachusetts from 1990 to 1992.

Career 
After serving as the New England Regional Administrator-Regional Housing Commissioner for the United States Department of Housing and Urban Development, and as Secretary of Health and Human Services of Massachusetts he went on to become the dean of the Anna Maria College of the School of Business. During the 2014 Massachusetts gubernatorial election, Forsberg served as the chairman of Charlie Baker's campaign.

References 

Year of birth missing (living people)
Living people
Bowdoin College alumni
Boston University alumni
Massachusetts Republicans